Zonuzaq Rural District is in the Central District of Marand County, East Azerbaijan province, Iran. At the National Census of 2006, its population was 3,327 in 836 households. There were 2,717 inhabitants in 845 households at the following census of 2011. At the most recent census of 2016, the population of the rural district was 2,075 in 687 households. The largest of its seven villages was Zonuzaq, with 1,052 people.

References 

Marand County

Rural Districts of East Azerbaijan Province

Populated places in East Azerbaijan Province

Populated places in Marand County